The black cicadabird (Edolisoma melas), also known as the New Guinea cuckooshrike or New Guinea cicadabird, is a species of bird in the family Campephagidae.  It is found in the Aru Islands and New Guinea.  Its natural habitats are subtropical or tropical moist lowland forest and subtropical or tropical mangrove forest.

References

black cicadabird
Birds of New Guinea
black cicadabird
Taxonomy articles created by Polbot